King is a single-member electoral district for the South Australian House of Assembly. It was created by the redistribution conducted in 2016, and was contested for the first time at the 2018 state election.

King is named after Len King , a former Chief Justice of the Supreme Court of South Australia and Attorney-General in the Dunstan government.

The Electoral District Boundaries Commission considered that it had renamed the electoral district of Napier to King, but only 1479 of the estimated 27,002 voters in King had previously been voters in Napier from the rural areas of Bibaringa, One Tree Hill, Uleybury, Yattalunga. The majority of voters in King came from Wright in the suburbs of Golden Grove, Greenwith, Salisbury East and from Little Para in the suburbs of Gould Creek, Hillbank, Salisbury Heights, Salisbury Park.

Geography 
At its creation in 2016, King contained the suburbs of Bibaringa, Uleybury, Yattalunga, One Tree Hill, Gould Creek, Hillbank, Golden Grove, Greenwith, Salisbury Heights, Salisbury Park and part of Salisbury East. The northern part is essentially rural and the southern part is suburban. It is on the western foothills of the Mount Lofty Ranges at the northern end of Adelaide.

The 2020 redistribution has moved the northern boundary south to Uley Road which has resulted in the movement of the suburbs of Bibaringa, Uleybury and Yattalunga which were part of the former Electorate of Napier to Schubert.

Members for King

Election results

Notes

References
 ECSA profile for King: 2018
 ABC profile for King: 2018
 Poll Bludger profile for King: 2018

King